Aaah is a 2001 Maldivian drama film directed by Amjad Ibrahim. Produced by Abdulla Shafeeq, the film stars Yoosuf Shafeeu, Mohamed Shavin, Ibrahim Giyas, Sheela Najeeb and Jamsheedha Ahmed in pivotal roles.

Premise
Faisal (Mohamed Shavin) hired Ruwaisha (Sheela Najeeb) as his personal secretary. A romantic relationship builds between them and later gets married. Faisal accompanied his wife and his younger brother, Mifzal (Ibrahim Giyas) travel to Maamingili for a business project; opening a guest shop in the island. There they meet Aisha (Jamsheedha Ahmed), an adopted child of Javid, a friend of Faisal's father, Thaufeeq (Koyya Hassan Manik). Mifzal proposes to Aisha and they spent an enjoyable trip in the island until Aisha's husband, Junaid (Yoosuf Shafeeu) shows up.

Cast 
 Yoosuf Shafeeu as Junaid
 Mohamed Shavin as Faisal
 Ibrahim Giyas as Mifzal
 Sheela Najeeb as Ruwaisha
 Jamsheedha Ahmed as Aisha
 Koyya Hassan Manik as Thaufeeq
Amjad Ibrahim as Javid
Sakeena as Mifzal & Faisal's mother

Soundtrack

References

2001 films
2001 drama films
Maldivian drama films
Films directed by Amjad Ibrahim
Dhivehi-language films